Cassinia ozothamnoides, commonly known as cottony haeckeria, is a species of flowering plant in the family Asteraceae and is endemic to Victoria, Australia. It is an erect shrub with hairy branchlets, linear leaves and corymbs of up to two hundred flower heads.

Description
The upper surface of the leaves is dark green, the edges rolled under, the lower surface is densely covered with white, woolly hairs and there is a small point on the end. Between 50 and 200 heads are arranged in corymbs  in diameter.

Taxonomy and naming
This species was first formally described in 1855 by Ferdinand von Mueller who gave it the name Haeckeria ozothamnoides in his Definitions of rare or hitherto undescribed Australian plants. In 2004, Anthony Edward Orchard changed the name to Cassinia ozothamnoides in Australian Systematic Botany. The specific epithet (ozothamnoides) means "Ozothamnus-like".

Distribution

References

ozothamnoides
Asterales of Australia
Flora of Victoria (Australia)
Plants described in 1855
Taxa named by Ferdinand von Mueller